The 1978–79 Serie A season was won by Milan.  Notably, Perugia were the first team during the round-robin era to go through the season undefeated, although due to their number of drawn matches, they finished second in the league.

Teams
Ascoli, Catanzaro and Avellino had been promoted from Serie B.

Final classification

Results

Top goalscorers

References and sources
Almanacco Illustrato del Calcio - La Storia 1898-2004, Panini Edizioni, Modena, September 2005

External links
 :it:Classifica calcio Serie A italiana 1979 - Italian version with pictures and info.
  - All results on RSSSF Website.

1978-79
Italy
1